Tourism is one of the major industries in the Great Barrier Reef region.  Approximately five million people visit the Great Barrier Reef each year. According to the WWF, tourism of the area contributes  $5.4 billion a year to the Australian economy, and employs approximately 69,000 people.  Ove Hoegh-Guldberg sees the key competitive advantage of the Great Barrier Reef as opposed to other, closer, reef tourism destinations is the region's reputation as being "the most pristine coral reef on the planet". The GBRMPA states that careful management, which includes permits for camping and all commercial marine tourism within the Great Barrier Reef Marine Park, has so far ensured that tourists have a very minimal impact on the reef.

History

The earliest known tourism in the region took place on Green Island in the 1890s.  In the early 20th century, scientific field expeditions became popular in the region, which laid the groundwork for tourism.  Another tourist activity that was briefly popular was visiting Aboriginal missions, but this was clamped down upon by the missionaries who disapproved of the tourists giving money and goods to the Aboriginals.  Torres Strait Islanders relocated south to the Whitsundays to demonstrate turtle hunting and performed songs and dances for tourists.  In 1931, The Morning Bulletin called for increased awareness of tourism in the area, extolling the game fish that could be caught in the region.  Tourism largely stopped during World War II.

During the 1960s and 1970s, tourist numbers grew steadily, and transport improved and boats that extended day trips to between 15 and 20 nautical miles were invented.  The remoteness of several parts of the Great Barrier Reef had naturally prevented access and therefore human impacts.

In 1981, the Great Barrier Reef was inscribed on the world heritage list.  Tourism is regarded to be an important way that Australia can fulfill its duty to present the Great Barrier Reef in accordance with the world heritage convention. In the 1980s, tourism in the Great Barrier Reef region expanded rapidly.  At one point during the 1980s, a floating hotel operated.  As of 1987, 450,000 tourists visited.  Skeat and Skeat attribute the growth in tourist numbers during the 1980s to improved air access to regional areas, including the Cairns International Airport, and large catamarans which allowed day trips of 50 nautical miles. During the 1980s, there was concern that tourism was harming the reef. The disappearance of Tom and Eileen Lonergan in 1998 while scuba diving off the Great Barrier Reef caused the Queensland
government to commission a task force to review the workplace health and safety standards of recreational diving and snorkelling.

The 2008 financial crisis saw a reduction in both international travellers and business travellers, with the later group declining by 9% in 2009 compared to the previous year. After the 2010–2011 Queensland floods many travellers cancelled trips to the state, resulting in a loss of hundreds of millions of dollars.

The Reserve Bank deputy governor Philip Lowe stated in February 2012 that tourism in Australia is having undergo structural changes because of a contraction in the sector due to the impact of a high Australian dollar. By 2012, the estimated value of tourism in the Great Barrier Reef region had reached $5.5 billion. In the wake of Cyclone Marcia, a marketing campaign urged people to visit the region to help it recover.  In response to the coral bleaching event of 2016, where only 7% of the reef was unaffected, the tourism industry created a hashtag, #GBRtoday showing healthy corals.  Also in 2016, the Australian government asked for a chapter on climate change and the Great Barrier Reef to be removed from UNESCO's report on the status of the Great Barrier Reef over concerns it could impact on tourism.  Domestic tourism to the reef subsequently fell.

Locations
As of 2003, 85% of tourism in the region was concentrated in Cairns and the Whitsunday areas of the Marine Park.

Vessel-based tourism operations
Vessel-based tourism operations can serve from 10 to over 400 people.  Extended vessel-based tourism operations can last for weeks and move between different sites.

Safety
The disappearance of Tom and Eileen Lonergan in 1998 while scuba diving off the Great Barrier Reef caused the Queensland
government to commission a task force to review the workplace health and safety standards of recreational diving and snorkelling.  In 2003, Gabe Watson and his wife Tina were dive buddies on an expedition, despite Tina's inexperience.  Tina drowned and Watson was subsequently convicted of manslaughter. In 2008, another two tourists were left behind, and had to tread water for 19 hours.  In 2011, another tourist was left snorkelling and had to swim to another boat.

Types of tourists
A survey conducted in 2003 found that visitors to the Whitsundays were likely to be first-time visitors to the Great Barrier Reef, had an average age of 37, were mainly international visitors, were likely to be visiting with a partner or their family, and were likely to have taken part in snorkelling, swimming, or taking part on a semi-submersible tour.

A report in 1995 found that tourists expected to see beautiful islands and beaches, to experience a "natural, unspoilt environment", and to see a variety of fish and corals, and compare their experience with idealised tourist advertising.

A report in 1999 found that older tourists participated in fewer activities at the Great Barrier Reef, and urged caution in considering them a lucrative market.

A 2003 paper discussed the patterns of repeat visitors to the GBR region.  It found that they were younger, likely to be backpackers or interstate tourists, if they were international visitors they were likely to be from North America or Europe, more likely to go diving, and more likely to seek smaller, specialised operations for their return visit.

A survey in 2015 found that two thirds of tourists wanted to see the Great Barrier Reef before it was gone.

Management and regulations
The Great Barrier Reef Marine Park Act 1975 is one of the major laws governing the management of the Great Barrier Reef Marine Park. When it was passed, the management of tourism was seen as an important issue.  Ros Kelly proposed a 1% tax on tourism activities in the GBR in 1991, but this was criticised by Queensland's premier, Wayne Goss. All licensed tourism operations in the Marine Park must pay the Environmental Management Charge (EMC), introduced in 1993, which provided 18% of the Great Barrier Reef Marine Park Authority's budget in 2009–2010.

See also
 Tourism in Australia
 Environmental threats to the Great Barrier Reef
 Tourism Queensland
 Visa policy of Australia

References

 
 
 
 
 
 
 
 
 
 
 
 
 
 Queensland: Great Barrier Reef World Heritage Area

External links

 GBRMPA's tour operator guide – activities, permits, regulations
 GBRMPA's visitor trends

Resorts

 Voyages Hotels & Resorts et al.

Benefits
 Measuring the Economic and Financial Value of the Great Barrier Reef Marine Park – large 2005 publication

Impact
 The Effects Of Qualified Recreational Scuba Divers On Coral Reefs – exec summary

Management
 GBRMPA tourism management
 Zoning - lessons from the GBR – paper
 GBRMPA Management Status: Tourism & Recreation
 Great Barrier Reef protection to increase sevenfold – The Guardian

Great Barrier Reef
Tourist attractions in Queensland